is a Japanese mixed martial artist, professional wrestler and grappler currently competing in ONE Championship's and Rizin Fighting Federation's Welterweight division. He also competes in DDT Pro-Wrestling where he is a former three-time DDT Extreme Champion. A professional competitor since 2003, he is noted for being the DREAM Lightweight Champion, former two time ONE Lightweight World Champion, former WAMMA Lightweight Champion and former Shooto Welterweight Champion. Aoki is an A-class Shootist and BJJ black belt, both under his long-term mentor Yuki Nakai, as well as a Black Belt Judoka. As of 2008, Aoki, along with DEEP champion Masakazu Imanari, and Sengoku champion Satoru Kitaoka have founded the "Nippon Top Team" as a group of elite Japanese grapplers competing in MMA. As well as his MMA credentials, Aoki has garnered several submission grappling accolades including two All Japan Jiu-Jitsu Championships, a Japan Open Jiu-Jitsu Championship, a Budo Open Championship, and an ADCC Japan Championship. As of October 6, 2022, he is ranked #5 in the ONE Lightweight rankings.

Mixed martial arts career
Training in Judo since childhood, Aoki became a successful Judoka and competed in national and international championships. He attended Waseda University where he was part of the Judo Club. However, interested in modalities like Kosen Judo which were away from him due to the Kodokan competition rules, he moved to other combat sports, until landing in mixed martial arts. One of the key influences that shifted Aoki to mixed martial arts was watching Kazushi Sakuraba defeat powerful foreign players in Pride FC. Aoki initially joined the Judo-based RJJ gym before moving to Team Roken along with his longtime friend Masakazu Imanari, though he later moved to Paraestra Shooto Gym, where he trained under former Kosen representative Yuki Nakai. He earned both his A-class Shooto rank as well as his Brazilian Jiu-Jitsu black belt under Nakai, and became one of the team's main teachers.

DEEP and Shooto
Aoki had his MMA debut for DEEP in November 2003, winning a one night tournament by fast armbar submissions. He later would show further unorthodox grappling skills against veteran Seichi Ikemoto and Keith Wisniewski, who he defeated by breaking his arm with a standing wakigatame also known as a Fujiwara armbar. He also would face legendary Hayato Sakurai in a Shooto event, losing a decision which was seen as controversial. Aoki went to compete in both companies until 2007, also defeating Akira Kikuchi to win the Shooto Welterweight Championship.

PRIDE Fighting Championships
In August 2006, Aoki made his PRIDE Fighting Championships debut at Pride Bushido 12, submitting American fighter Jason Black in under two minutes with a triangle choke. Following that win, Aoki was booked to face rising Lightweight star Gilbert Melendez at the following Bushido card, Bushido 13. However, prior to the fight Melendez received an elbow injury (a burst bursa sac) in training and was forced to pull out of the fight. Aoki's opponent was changed to Clay French. Aoki submitted French in just under four minutes with a triangle choke. Afterwards, Melendez was shown in the crowd with a sling, and announced he would like to face Aoki at Pride Shockwave 2006 on New Year's Eve. Aoki agreed.

For unknown reasons, the proposed fight with Melendez did not take place. Instead, Aoki faced highly ranked Lightweight fighter Joachim Hansen. Aoki submitted Hansen with a gogoplata—this was the second successful gogoplata in MMA competition (the first by Ryusuke Uemura).

After his win over Hansen, Aoki was set to rematch Kikuchi in Shooto, with Aoki's Shooto Welterweight title (previously won from Kikuchi) on the line. Aoki successfully defended his title against Kikuchi, winning via split decision.

Following his victory, Aoki announced that he was to be the Shooto representative in the forthcoming Pride Lightweight Grand Prix tournament. Aoki's next fight was at Pride 34, where he faced little known Dutch fighter Brian Lo-A-Njoe. At the event Aoki submitted Lo-A-Njoe in the first round with an armbar. Following the fight, Aoki once again confirmed his participation in the Lightweight Grand Prix. With the purchase of Pride by the majority owners of Zuffa LLC, the Pride Lightweight Grand Prix was cancelled.

On November 21, 2007, Aoki's participation on the New Year's Eve MMA card Yarennoka! was announced. Originally, his opponent was to be two-time K-1 Hero's Middleweight Grand Prix champion Gesias "JZ Calvan" Cavalcante. Rumors that Cavalcante was injured surfaced only two weeks before the bout, though Cavalcante denied them before eventually admitting the injury and withdrawing from the fight. Aoki defeated Korean Olympic Judo silver medalist Jung Bu-Kyung, Cavalcante's replacement, via unanimous decision in what was Jung Bu-Kyung's mixed martial arts debut. Aoki had promised to use a never before seen submission in the match but was unable to finish the debut fighter.

Fighting and Entertainment Group
After the purchase of Pride by Zuffa LLC, most Japanese fighters signed to newly created mixed martial arts promotions, with Aoki signing to Dream.  Here Aoki finally faced Cavalcante on March 15, 2008 at the opening round of the Dream Lightweight Grand Prix tournament. Early in the first round, the referee stopped the action when Cavalcante apparently landed illegal elbow strikes to the back of Aoki's neck. The ringside doctor announced that Aoki was unable to continue due to the injury and Cavalcante apologized for the incident.  The fight resulted in a no contest. Elbow strikes to the neck and spine area are illegal under Dream rules. Aoki was later found to have sustained concussion of the cervical vertebra.

They had their rematch at Dream 2 on April 29, 2008. In that match, Aoki defeated Cavalcante via unanimous decision.  He sustained a severely bruised rib and tore cartilage in his costal area during the match.  At Dream 4, Aoki defeated Katsuhiko Nagata via a mounted gogoplata (possibly the first ever in professional competition, later to be dubbed "the Aoki-plata") submission to advance to the semi-finals of the Dream Lightweight Grand Prix. At Dream 5, Aoki defeated Caol Uno by unanimous decision. Later that night, Eddie Alvarez was set to fight Aoki, but had to bow out due to injury from his previous match that evening. Joachim Hansen took his place and defeated Aoki by TKO (punches) at 4:19 round 1 to become the first Dream Lightweight Champion.

At Dynamite!! 2008 on New Year's Eve, Aoki finally squared off against American Eddie Alvarez for the WAMMA Lightweight Championship. Aoki started quickly, securing Alvarez's back after catching a kick, before being thrown to the canvas by the stronger American. In a scramble, Aoki latched onto the foot of Alvarez and applied a heel hook. Alvarez fought the hold, but tapped out shortly after Aoki adjusted his grip. Alvarez also suffered ligament damage in his knee.

Aoki defeated David Gardner at the March 8, 2009 Featherweight Grand Prix card at Dream 7 at the Saitama Super Arena in Saitama, Japan. This fight is remembered for Gardner waving to the crowd as Aoki was controlling his back and saying "Hello, Japan!", thus allowing Aoki to secure a rear-naked choke from that position. Aoki, who was still recognized by Shooto as its Welterweight Champion, also moved back to that weight to fight in Dream's Welterweight Grand Prix at Dream 8 in 2009. His first match in the tournament was a rematch with Hayato Sakurai. Aoki lost the fight in twenty-seven seconds via TKO due to punches and knees following a Sakurai reversal from a takedown by Aoki. As a result of the match, Aoki did not advance in the DREAM 2009 Welterweight Grand Prix.

Aoki met Fedor Emelianenko during a five-minute "special exhibition" at an April 29 M-1 Challenge (presented by Affliction) event in Tokyo. Emelianenko made Aoki tap out from an Achilles lock.

Aoki defeated Vítor Ribeiro at Dream 10 on July 20, 2009, which earned him a title fight against Joachim Hansen. Aoki faced Joachim Hansen in a rematch for the DREAM Lightweight Championship at Dream 11 on October 6, 2009.  Last time they met, Aoki previously fought a tough match against Caol Uno on the same night which went on for both two rounds (15 minutes) when Hansen only fought for 2 minutes 35 seconds previously.  Aoki ended up defeating Hansen in the second round for the title shot via submission (armbar) to become the new DREAM Lightweight Champion.

On December 22, 2009, it was announced that Aoki would not be taking on fellow DREAM fighter Tatsuya Kawajiri, but would be fighting Sengoku Lightweight Champion, Mizuto Hirota.  In his pre-fight interview Aoki stated that he felt insulted with the short notice changes as he was looking forward to battling it out with one of the world's other top lightweight competitors in Kawajiri.  Aoki's opponent Hirota just came off a spectacular win over longtime friend of Aoki's, Satoru Kitaoka to become the new Sengoku Lightweight champion.  The fight between Aoki and Hirota was considered to be one of the main events of the night along with Satoshi Ishii vs. Hidehiko Yoshida and the K-1 bout Masato vs Andy Souwer.  Aoki defeated Hirota with a brutal submission (hammerlock) that broke Hirota's arm in the first round at 1:17.  He then proceeded to get in the face of his downed opponent and give him the finger then, get up and run around the ring doing the same to the crowd before leaving the ring.

DREAM and Strikeforce
Aoki lost his US debut against then Strikeforce Lightweight Champion Gilbert Melendez on April 17, 2010 at Strikeforce: Nashville. The fight was broadcast live to a North American audience on CBS. After Aoki's defeat to Gilbert Melendez in Strikeforce he has expressed interest to train at Cesar Gracie's camp in northern California.

Aoki successfully defended his Lightweight title against top contender Tatsuya Kawajiri in just under two minutes of the first round via an Achilles lock submission, at Dream 15 on July 10, 2010.

Aoki defeated Marcus Aurélio by unanimous decision in a non-title bout on September 25, 2010 at Dream 16.

He then competed again at Deep: 50th Impact on October 24 against former PABA and WBA boxing champion Yokthai Sithoar. Aoki won by submission (americana) 1:00 into the first round against Sithoar.

After the proposed rematch with Melendez fell through due to contract issues on Melendez's part, Aoki faced K-1 kickboxer Yuichiro "Jienotsu" Nagashima in a special rules exhibition bout at Dynamite!! 2010. In the first 3-minute kickboxing round, Aoki evaded Nagashima's offense by breaking the rules via excessive clinching, falling to the ground, and going for takedowns in order to run out the clock and move onto the 5-minute mixed martial arts round. Aoki was warned repeatedly by the referee, however no points were deducted as there could not be a decision winner. The commentary team of Michael Schiavello and Frank Trigg were openly criticising Aoki for his rule breaking during the first round, while the Japanese crowd uncharacteristically booed him. At 0:04 of the second MMA rules round, Aoki was knocked out immediately as he went for a double leg takedown via flying knee and subsequent grounded strikes. Since the bout was contested as an exhibition, the loss is not reflected on Aoki's professional mixed martial arts record.

Aoki then defeated Lyle Beerbohm on April 9, 2011 at Strikeforce: Diaz vs. Daley via neck crank in the first round.

Aoki was expected to face Willamy Freire on May 29, 2011 at Dream: Fight for Japan!. Freire reportedly had trouble getting a visa, and it then appeared that he would be facing Antonio McKee instead, but then McKee chose to pull out of the card. It was then announced that Shane Nelson would fight Aoki, but he was quickly replaced with Rich Clementi. Aoki defeated Clementi by way of Neck Crank/Rear Naked Choke at the 2:32 mark of the second round.

Aoki defeated Rob McCullough by neck crank at the 4:57 point of Round 1 at Dream 17.

Aoki fought Satoru Kitaoka for the DREAM lightweight title at Fight For Japan: Genki Desu Ka Omisoka 2011. He won the fight via unanimous decision.

Aoki Took on former Maximum Fighting Championship Lightweight Champion, Antonio McKee at Dream 18 on December 31, 2012. He won via TKO in the second round.

Bellator Fighting Championships 
Aoki faced Eddie Alvarez in a rematch at Bellator 66. He lost the fight via TKO in the first round.

ONE Championship
On June 27 it was revealed that Aoki had signed an exclusive contract with ONE Championship and would be making his debut at ONE Fighting Championship: Pride of a Nation in Manila on August 31. On August 16 it was revealed that Aoki would be fighting Arnaud Lepont in a lightweight super fight in the main event at ONE Fighting Championship: Rise of Kings He won the fight via triangle choke at the 1:25 point of the first round.

Aoki faced Kotetsu Boku at ONE Fighting Championship: Kings and Champions on April 5, 2013 for the Lightweight Championship. He stated that win or lose, he will be dropping to the Featherweight division after the fight. Aoki defeated his opponent at 2:01 of the second round via rear-naked choke, successfully avenging his Evolve teammate Zorobabel Moreira.

Aoki made his featherweight debut on October 18, 2013 at ONE FC: Total Domination when he took on Cody Stevens.  He won the fight via unanimous decision.

Aoki later returned to lightweight and picked up a victory in the Inoki Bom-Ba-Ye promotion before successfully defending his ONE Lightweight World Championship against Kamal Shalorus by submission in the first round at ONE FC: Reign of Champions on August 29, 2014.
Aoki defended his title against Koji Ando at ONE Championship 28: Warrior's Quest on May 22, 2015.

RIZIN Fighting Federation
Rizin Fighting Federation announced Aoki would compete on December 29, 2015 against Kazushi Sakuraba in the main event of their inaugural event. He won the fight via TKO at 5:56 in the first round after Sakuraba's corner threw in the towel.

Return to ONE
In the third defense of his title, Aoki faced Eduard Folayang at ONE Championship: Defending Honor on November 11, 2016 in Singapore. He lost the bout and title via TKO in the third round.

Aoki faced Ben Askren on November 24, 2017. He lost the fight via TKO in the fight's opening minute.

Aoki faced Ev Ting on October 6, 2018 at ONE Championship: Kingdom of Heroes and won the fight via arm-triangle choke in the opening minute of the bout. Due to the victory, Aoki secured a fight for the vacant lightweight championship against the winner of Eduard Folayang and Amir Khan in the promotion's inaugural event in Tokyo, Japan on March 31, 2019.

On March 31, 2019 at ONE Championship: A New Era Aoki recaptured the lightweight title in a rematch with Eduard Folayang by defeating Folayang via technical submission.

Aoki lost the title in his first defense against Christian Lee at ONE Championship: Enter the Dragon on May 17, 2019.

He returned to defeat Honorio Banario via D'Arce choke at ONE Championship: Century.

Aoki next faced Kimihiro Eto at Road to One 3: Tokyo Fight Night on September 10, 2020. He won the fight via unanimous decision.

Aoki was expected to face former LFA Welterweight Champion James Nakashima on January 22, 2021 at ONE Championship: Unbreakable He won the fight via submission in the first round.

Aoki was scheduled to fight the former UFC Lightweight Sage Northcutt at ONE on TNT 4, on April 28, 2021. The bout was subsequently cancelled due to Sage still having lingering effects from COVID-19. A new bout was scheduled for the event with Aoki facing off against former rival Eduard Folayang. He won the bout via armbar in the first round.

Aoki faced Yoshihiro Akiyama at ONE: X on March 26, 2022. He lost the fight via TKO in the second round.

Aoki was booked to face Saygid Izagakhmaev on November 19, 2022, at ONE 163. He lost the fight by a first-round technical knockout.

Professional wrestling career

Inoki Genome Federation (2013–2017) 
Aoki began dabbling in pro wrestling in 2014 for Antonio Inoki's Inoki Genome Federation (IGF), competing in a series of MMA fights on his cards before eventually transitioning to pro wrestling. In 2017, Aoki was announced as a member of Next Exciting Wrestling (NEW), a new show under the IGF banner. Aoki competed on the first show, defeating Keisuke Okuda. Aoki competed for NEW until IGF announced its cancellation in July 2017. In his last match for NEW, Aoki lost to Tatsuhito Takaiwa.

DDT Pro Wrestling (2018–present) 

After a short hiatus, Aoki announced his return to pro wrestling in 2018, and that he would be competing for DDT Pro Wrestling. Aoki made his in-ring debut at Maji Manji #15, quickly defeating Gota Ihashi. On October 28, at Maji Manji #21, Aoki defeated Harashima to win the DDT Extreme Championship. Aoki lost the title back to Harashima on February 19, 2019 at Judgement.

Grappling career 
At the Reversal Cup in 2004, Aoki fought Kuniyoshi Hironaka in a superfight and submitted him with a flying armbar that broke his arm.

Aoki was scheduled to compete against Gordon Ryan at a ONE Championship event in August, 2021 but the match was cancelled due to a stomach condition that Ryan was suffering from at the time. He was then booked to compete against Kade Ruotolo at ONE 157 on May 20th, 2021 instead. Aoki lost the match by decision.

Controversy
Aoki has received criticisms by the mixed martial arts community for his disrespectful victory celebrations and perceived lack of care for his opponents, often causing injuries which are seen as needless. He firstly became known for breaking Keith Wisniewski's arm by waki-gatame, then doing the same with Kuniyoshi Hironaka via flying armbar in a submission grappling match, sidelining him for a year. In 2009, controversy would come when he faced Mizuto Hirota in a super bout. After Aoki won by breaking Hirota's arm in a brutal fashion, he gave the middle finger to the downed fighter and the crowd while running excitedly.

Despite the crowd actually cheering him back, pundits found the act as extremely offensive and unsportsmanlike, among them Dream executive Keiichi Sasahara and Aoki's trainer Yuki Nakai. Aoki would later apologize for his behavior in his post fight interview:

As a result of his actions following his win, Aoki was dismissed as an instructor at the Paraestra Kasai gym, though he was still training under Nakai and representing Paraestra.

In 2014, after submitting Yuki Yamamoto, Aoki again taunted his opponent and the crowd with a middle finger, while Yamamoto had to be restrained by his cornermen. Shinya left the arena without putting down the taunt.

Fighting style
Nicknamed "Tobikan Judan" ("The Grand Master of Flying Submissions") due to his spectacular submissions, Aoki is considered an unusual fighter for his heavy specialization in grappling at the expense of other areas of the MMA game. Therefore, virtually all of his stand-up game is focused on taking his opponent to the ground, utilizing chain combinations of wrestling and judo techniques from the clinch to secure his goal, as well as the more dramatic guard pulling. Once on the mat, Aoki is an electric grappler, drawing strength from his expertise in many different disciplines like Shooto's style of shoot wrestling, judo, jiu-jitsu and Eddie Bravo's 10th Planet Jiu-Jitsu system. He is an active guard player, favouring specially the rubber guard thanks to his flexibility, and is famous for his creative approach to submissions, excelling not only in armlocks and leglocks, but also in neck cranks and more exotic joint locks.

Championships and accomplishments

Mixed martial arts
DEEP
DEEP West Chofu Tournament Winner
DREAM
DREAM Lightweight Championship (One time, last)
 two successful title defenses
ONE Championship
ONE Lightweight World Championship (Two times)
 two successful title defenses
Submission of the Year 2021 
Professional Shooto Japan
Shooto Middleweight Championship (One time)
 one successful title defense
World Alliance of Mixed Martial Arts
WAMMA Lightweight Championship (One time; first; last)
Inside MMA
2008 Submission of the Year Bazzie Award vs. Katsuhiko Nagata on June 15
Sherdog
2011 All-Violence Third Team
2006 Submission of the Year vs. Joachim Hansen on December 31
Bleacher Report
2000s Grappler of the Decade
fightmatrix.com
Lineal MMA Lightweight Championship (One time)
Six Successful Title defenses

Professional wrestling
DDT Pro-Wrestling
DDT Extreme Championship (3 times)
Ironman Heavymetalweight Championship (3 times)
KO-D 8-Man/10-Man Tag Team Championship (2 times, current) – with Super Sasadango Machine, Antonio Honda and Kazuki Hirata (1) and Mao, Yuki Ueno, Shunma Katsumata and Toui Kojima (1)

Submission grappling
ADCC Japan
66–76 kg: 1st place
Deep X
Deep X Superfight Champion (2007)
Shooto
Shooto Grappling Champion (2006)
Dumau/Kansai
Dumau/Kansai Cup Champion (2005)
All Japan Jiu-Jitsu
All Japan Champion (2004-brown belt); (2005-black belt)
Rickson Gracie's Budo Challenge
2005 Middleweight Champion
Rickson Gracie Invitational
1st place
Other Accolades
Top five collegiate Judoka
GI Grappling 05, 1st place
Reversal Cup Champion (2004)

Mixed martial arts record

|-
|Loss
|align=center|47–11 (1)
|Saygid Izagakhmaev 
|TKO (punches)
|ONE 163
|
|align=center|1
|align=center|1:26
|Kallang, Singapore
|
|-
|Loss
|align=center|47–10 (1)
|Yoshihiro Akiyama
|TKO (punches)
|ONE: X
|
|align=center| 2
|align=center| 1:50 
| Kallang, Singapore
|
|-
|Win
|align=center|47–9 (1)
|Eduard Folayang
|Submission (armbar)
|ONE on TNT 4
|
|align=center|1
|align=center|4:20
| Kallang, Singapore
|
|-
| Win
| align=center|46–9 (1)
| James Nakashima
| Submission (rear-naked choke)
| ONE: Unbreakable
| 
| align=center|1
| align=center|2:42
| Kallang, Singapore
| 
|-
| Win
| align=center|45–9 (1)
| Kimihiro Eto
| Decision (unanimous)
| Road to ONE 3: Tokyo Fight Night
| 
| align=center|3
| align=center|5:00
| Tokyo, Japan
|
|-
| Win
| align=center|44–9 (1)
| Honorio Banario
| Submission (D’Arce choke)
| ONE: Century Part 2
| 
| align=center|1
| align=center|0:54
| Tokyo, Japan
| 
|-
| Loss
| align=center| 43–9 (1)
| Christian Lee
| TKO (punches)
| ONE: Enter the Dragon
| 
| align=center| 2
| align=center| 0:51
| Kallang, Singapore
| 
|-
| Win
| align=center|43–8 (1)
| Eduard Folayang
| Technical Submission (arm-triangle choke)
| ONE: A New Era
| 
| align=center| 1
| align=center| 2:34
| Tokyo, Japan
| 
|-
| Win
| align=center|42–8 (1)
| Ev Ting
| Submission (arm-triangle choke)
| ONE: Kingdom of Heroes
| 
| align=center| 1
| align=center| 0:57
| Bangkok, Thailand
|
|-
| Win
| align=center| 41–8 (1)
| Shannon Wiratchai
| TKO (punches and elbows)
| ONE: Reign Of Kings
| 
| align=center| 1
| align=center| 2:16
| Manila, Philippines
| 
|-
| Win
| align=center| 40–8 (1)
| Rasul Yakhyaev
| Submission (triangle choke)
| ONE: Unstoppable Dreams
| 
| align=center| 1
| align=center| 3:15
| Kallang, Singapore
| 
|-
| Loss
| align=center| 39–8 (1)
| Ben Askren
| TKO (punches)
| ONE: Immortal Pursuit
| 
| align=center| 1
| align=center| 0:57
| Kallang, Singapore
| 
|-
| Loss
| align=center| 39–7 (1)
| Eduard Folayang
| TKO (knees and punches)
| ONE: Defending Honor
| 
| align=center| 3
| align=center| 0:41
| Kallang, Singapore
| 
|-
| Win
| align=center| 39–6 (1)
| Kazushi Sakuraba
| TKO (corner stoppage)
| Rizin World Grand Prix 2015: Part 1 - Saraba
| 
| align=center| 1
| align=center| 5:56
| Saitama, Saitama, Japan
| 
|-
| Win
| align=center| 38–6 (1)
| Koji Ando
| Decision (unanimous)
| ONE: Warrior's Quest
| 
| align=center| 5
| align=center| 5:00
| Kallang, Singapore
| 
|-
| Win
| align=center| 37–6 (1)
| Yuki Yamamoto
| Submission (twister)
| Inoki Bom-Ba-Ye 2014
| 
| align=center| 1
| align=center| 1:21
| Tokyo, Japan
|
|-
| Win
| align=center| 36–6 (1)
| Kamal Shalorus
| Submission (rear-naked choke)
| ONE FC: Reign of Champions
| 
| align=center| 1
| align=center| 2:15
| Dubai, United Arab Emirates
| 
|-
| Win
| align=center| 35–6 (1)
| Toshikatsu Harada
| Technical Submission (triangle armbar)
| Inoki Bom-Ba-Ye 2013
| 
| align=center| 1
| align=center| 0:49
| Tokyo, Japan
| 
|-
| Win
| align=center| 34–6 (1)
| Cody Stevens
| Decision (unanimous)
| ONE FC: Total Domination
| 
| align=center| 3
| align=center| 5:00
| Kallang, Singapore
| 
|-
| Win
| align=center| 33–6 (1)
| Kotetsu Boku
| Submission (rear-naked choke)
| ONE FC: Kings and Champions
| 
| align=center| 2
| align=center| 2:01
| Kallang, Singapore
| 
|-
| Win
| align=center| 32–6 (1)
| Antonio McKee
| TKO (submission to punch)
| DREAM 18
| 
| align=center| 2
| align=center| 0:24
| Tokyo, Japan
| 
|-
| Win
| align=center| 31–6 (1)
| Arnaud Lepont
| Technical Submission (triangle choke)
| ONE FC: Rise of Kings
| 
| align=center| 1
| align=center| 1:25
| Kallang, Singapore
| 
|-
| Loss
| align=center| 30–6 (1)
| Eddie Alvarez
| TKO (punches)
| Bellator 66
| 
| align=center| 1
| align=center| 2:14
| Cleveland, Ohio, United States
| 
|-
| Win
| align=center| 30–5 (1)
| Satoru Kitaoka
| Decision (unanimous)
| Fight For Japan: Genki Desu Ka Omisoka 2011
| 
| align=center| 5
| align=center| 5:00
| Saitama, Saitama, Japan
| 
|-
| Win
| align=center| 29–5 (1)
| Rob McCullough
| Submission (neck crank)
| DREAM 17
| 
| align=center| 1
| align=center| 4:57
| Saitama, Saitama, Japan
| 
|-
| Win
| align=center| 28–5 (1)
| Rich Clementi
| Submission (neck crank)
| DREAM: Fight for Japan!
| 
| align=center| 2
| align=center| 2:32
| Saitama, Saitama, Japan
| 
|-
| Win
| align=center| 27–5 (1)
| Lyle Beerbohm
| Submission (neck crank)
| Strikeforce: Diaz vs. Daley 
| 
| align=center| 1
| align=center| 1:33
| San Diego, California, United States
| 
|-
| Win
| align=center| 26–5 (1)
| Yokthai Sithoar
| Submission (keylock)
| DEEP: 50 Impact
| 
| align=center| 1
| align=center| 1:00
| Tokyo, Japan
| 
|-
| Win
| align=center| 25–5 (1)
| Marcus Aurélio
| Decision (unanimous)
| DREAM 16
| 
| align=center| 2
| align=center| 5:00
| Nagoya, Japan
| 
|-
| Win
| align=center| 24–5 (1)
| Tatsuya Kawajiri
| Submission (Achilles lock)
| DREAM 15
| 
| align=center| 1
| align=center| 1:53
| Saitama, Saitama, Japan
| 
|-
| Loss
| align=center| 23–5 (1)
| Gilbert Melendez
| Decision (unanimous)
| Strikeforce: Nashville
| 
| align=center| 5
| align=center| 5:00
| Nashville, Tennessee, United States
| 
|-
| Win
| align=center| 23–4 (1)
| Mizuto Hirota
| Technical Submission (hammerlock)
| Dynamite!! The Power of Courage 2009
| 
| align=center| 1
| align=center| 1:17
| Saitama, Saitama, Japan
| 
|-
| Win
| align=center| 22–4 (1)
| Joachim Hansen
| Submission (armbar)
| DREAM 11
| 
| align=center| 2
| align=center| 4:56
| Yokohama, Japan
| 
|-
| Win
| align=center| 21–4 (1)
| Vítor Ribeiro
| Decision (unanimous)
| DREAM 10
| 
| align=center| 2
| align=center| 5:00
| Saitama, Saitama, Japan
| 
|-
| Loss
| align=center| 20–4 (1)
| Hayato Sakurai
| KO (knees and punches)
| DREAM 8
| 
| align=center| 1
| align=center| 0:27
| Nagoya, Japan
| 
|-
| Win
| align=center| 20–3 (1)
| David Gardner
| Submission (rear-naked choke)
| DREAM 7
| 
| align=center| 1
| align=center| 5:58
| Saitama, Saitama, Japan
| 
|-
| Win
| align=center| 19–3 (1)
| Eddie Alvarez
| Submission (heel hook)
| Fields Dynamite!! 2008
| 
| align=center| 1
| align=center| 1:32
| Saitama, Saitama, Japan
| 
|-
| Win
| align=center| 18–3 (1)
| Todd Moore
| Submission (neck crank)
| DREAM 6: Middleweight Grand Prix 2008 Final Round
| 
| align=center| 1
| align=center| 1:10
| Saitama, Saitama, Japan
| 
|-
| Loss
| align=center| 17–3 (1)
| Joachim Hansen
| TKO (punches)
| DREAM 5: Lightweight Grand Prix 2008 Final Round
| 
| align=center| 1 
| align=center| 4:19
| Osaka, Japan
| 
|-
| Win
| align=center| 17–2 (1)
| Caol Uno
| Decision (unanimous)
| DREAM 5: Lightweight Grand Prix 2008 Final Round
| 
| align=center| 2
| align=center| 5:00
| Osaka, Japan
| 
|-
| Win
| align=center| 16–2 (1)
| Katsuhiko Nagata
| Submission (gogoplata)
| DREAM 4: Middleweight Grand Prix 2008 Second Round
| 
| align=center| 1
| align=center| 5:12
| Yokohama, Japan
| 
|-
| Win
| align=center| 15–2 (1)
| Gesias Cavalcante
| Decision (unanimous)
| DREAM 2: Middleweight Grand Prix 2008 First Round
| 
| align=center| 2
| align=center| 5:00
| Saitama, Saitama, Japan
| 
|-
| NC
| align=center| 14–2 (1)
| Gesias Cavalcante
| NC (illegal elbows)
| DREAM 1: Lightweight Grand Prix 2008 First Round
| 
| align=center| 1
| align=center| 3:46
| Saitama, Saitama, Japan
| 
|-
| Win
| align=center| 14–2
| Jung Bu-Kyung
| Decision (unanimous)
| Yarennoka!
| 
| align=center| 2
| align=center| 5:00
| Saitama, Saitama, Japan
| 
|-
| Win
| align=center| 13–2
| Brian Lo-A-Njoe
| Submission (armbar)
| PRIDE 34: Kamikaze
| 
| align=center| 1
| align=center| 1:33
| Saitama, Saitama, Japan
| 
|-
| Win
| align=center| 12–2
| Akira Kikuchi
| Decision (split)
| Shooto: Back To Our Roots 1
| 
| align=center| 3
| align=center| 5:00
| Yokohama, Japan
| 
|-
| Win
| align=center| 11–2
| Joachim Hansen
| Submission (gogoplata)
| PRIDE FC: Shockwave 2006
| 
| align=center| 1
| align=center| 2:24
| Saitama, Saitama, Japan
| 
|-
| Win
| align=center| 10–2
| Clay French
| Submission (flying triangle choke)
| PRIDE Bushido 13
| 
| align=center| 1 
| align=center| 3:57
| Yokohama, Japan
| 
|-
| Win
| align=center| 9–2
| George Sotiropoulos
| DQ (groin kick)
| Shooto: Champion Carnival
| 
| align=center| 2
| align=center| 0:05
| Yokohama, Japan
| 
|-
| Win
| align=center| 8–2
| Jason Black
| Submission (triangle choke)
| PRIDE Bushido 12
| 
| align=center| 1
| align=center| 1:58
| Nagoya, Japan
| 
|-
| Win
| align=center| 7–2
| Akira Kikuchi
| Decision (unanimous)
| Shooto: The Victory of the Truth
| 
| align=center| 3
| align=center| 5:00
| Tokyo, Japan
| 
|-
| Win
| align=center| 6–2
| Kuniyoshi Hironaka
| TKO (doctor stoppage)
| Shooto 2005: 11/6 in Korakuen Hall
| 
| align=center| 1
| align=center| 2:10
| Tokyo, Japan
| 
|-
| Loss
| align=center| 5–2
| Hayato Sakurai
| Decision (unanimous)
| Shooto: Alive Road
| 
| align=center| 3 
| align=center| 5:00
| Yokohama, Japan
| 
|-
| Win
| align=center| 5–1
| Shigetoshi Iwase
| DQ (groin strike)
| Shooto 2005: 7/30 in Korakuen Hall
| 
| align=center| 1
| align=center| 0:35
| Tokyo, Japan
| 
|-
| Win
| align=center| 4–1
| Keith Wisniewski
| Technical Submission (standing armlock)
| Shooto: 1/29 in Korakuen Hall
| 
| align=center| 1
| align=center| 2:22
| Tokyo, Japan
| 
|-
| Loss
| align=center| 3–1
| Jutaro Nakao
| KO (punch)
| DEEP: 16th Impact
| 
| align=center| 1
| align=center| 4:29
| Tokyo, Japan
| 
|-
| Win
| align=center| 3–0
| Seichi Ikemoto
| Submission (armbar)
| DEEP: 15th Impact
| 
| align=center| 2
| align=center| 0:52
| Tokyo, Japan
| 
|-
| Win
| align=center| 2–0
| Yasutoshi Ryu
| Submission (armbar)
| rowspan=2|Deep: clubDeep West Chofu
| rowspan=2|
| align=center| 1
| align=center| 0:51
| Tokyo, Japan
| 
|-
| Win
| align=center| 1–0
| Dai Okimura
| Submission (armbar)
| align=center| 1
| align=center| 3:14
| Tokyo, Japan
|

Mixed rules record

|-
| Loss
|align=center| 0–1
| Yuichiro Nagashima
| KO (flying knee)
| Dynamite!! 2010
| 
|align=center| 2
|align=center| 0:04
| Chūō-ku, Saitama City, Japan
|

Legend: 

|}

Submission grappling record
KO PUNCHES
|- style="text-align:center; background:#f0f0f0;"
| style="border-style:none none solid solid; "|Result
| style="border-style:none none solid solid; "|Opponent
| style="border-style:none none solid solid; "|Method
| style="border-style:none none solid solid; "|Event
| style="border-style:none none solid solid; "|Date
| style="border-style:none none solid solid; "|Round
| style="border-style:none none solid solid; "|Time
| style="border-style:none none solid solid; "|Notes
|-
|Loss|| Kade Ruotolo||Decision||ONE 157||May 20, 2022||1||10:00||
|-
|Draw||Tomoshige Sera || Decision || Road to ONE 2nd: Aoki vs Sera|| April 17, 2020|| 1|| 10:00||
|-
|Win|| Marat Gafurov || Submission (rear-naked choke) || ONE Championship: Kings of Courage|| January 20, 2018|| 1|| 12:22||
|-
|Loss|| Garry Tonon || Submission (heel hook) || ONE Championship: Dynasty of Heroes|| May 26, 2017|| 1|| 7:47||
|-  
|Loss|| Kron Gracie || Submission (guillotine choke) || Metamoris II: Gracie vs Aoki|| June 9, 2013|| 1|| 6:50||
|-
|Win|| Pedro Akira || Submission (rear-naked choke) || DEEP X 2007|| 2007|| 1|| N/A||
|-
|Win|| Cameron Earle || Submission (ankle hold) || Budo Challenge –77 kg|| 2006|| 1|| N/A||
|-
|Win|| Ali Abdelaziz || Submission (flying armbar) || Budo Challenge –77 kg|| 2006|| 1|| N/A||
|-
|Win|| Hiroshi Tsuruya || Submission (gogoplata) || Shooto|| 2006|| 1|| N/A||
|-
|Win|| Naoyoshi Watanabe || Decision (points) || Professional Jiu Kansai|| 2005|| 1|| N/A||
|-
|Loss|| Roger Gracie || Submission (ankle hold) || ADCC 2005 Absolute|| 2005|| 1|| N/A||
|-
|Loss|| Marcelo García || Submission || ADCC 2005 –77 kg|| 2005|| 1|| N/A||
|-
|Win|| Marcos Avellan || Submission || ADCC 2005 –77 kg|| 2005|| 1|| N/A||
|-
|Win|| Masato Fujiwara || Submission (armbar) || ADCC 2005 Japan Qualifiers|| 2005|| 1|| N/A||
|-
|Win|| Mateus Irie Nechio || Submission (heel hook) || ADCC 2005 Japan Qualifiers|| 2005|| 1|| N/A||
|-
|Win|| Jung Changyoru || Submission (spinning choke) || ADCC 2005 Japan Qualifiers|| 2005|| 1|| N/A||
|-
|Win|| Koji Komuro || Submission (flying armbar) || Campeonato Japones de Jiu-Jitsu Abierto || 2004|| 1|| N/A||
|-
|Win|| Kuniyoshi Hironaka || Submission (flying armbar) || COPA Reversal 2004 〜Festa do Jiu-Jitsu〜 || 2004|| 1|| N/A||
|-
|Loss|| Naoyoshi Watanabe || Decision (points) || Professional Jiu Ground Impact 〜Gi-05〜 Midday War|| 2004|| 1|| N/A||
|-

See also
List of current ONE fighters
List of current mixed martial arts champions
List of male mixed martial artists
List of Brazilian Jiu-Jitsu practitioners

References

Sources

External links
 Shinya Aoki at ONE
 Shinya Aoki at Pride FC (archived)
 
 Shinya Aoki at BJJ Heroes

1983 births
Living people
Japanese male mixed martial artists
Japanese submission wrestlers
Japanese catch wrestlers
Lightweight mixed martial artists
Welterweight mixed martial artists
Mixed martial artists utilizing catch wrestling
Mixed martial artists utilizing shootfighting
Mixed martial artists utilizing judo
Mixed martial artists utilizing Brazilian jiu-jitsu
Japanese practitioners of Brazilian jiu-jitsu
People awarded a black belt in Brazilian jiu-jitsu
Japanese male judoka
Dream (mixed martial arts) champions
People from Shizuoka (city)
21st-century professional wrestlers
DDT Extreme Champions
Ironman Heavymetalweight Champions
KO-D 8-Man/10-Man Tag Team Champions
ONE Championship champions